Saskatchewan Soccer Association (SSA) is the governing body for soccer (Association Football) in the Canadian province of Saskatchewan. The association was formed in 1905.

History of Soccer in Saskatchewan 

Soccer has always played an integral part in Saskatchewan's history.  When the European immigrants came to Saskatchewan in the late 1800s, soccer came with them and the first game was played in Prince Albert on June 28, 1889.  The greatest indicator of expansion was the formation of the Saskatchewan Soccer Association; The Saskatchewan Soccer Association was formed in Grenfell, Saskatchewan on Good Friday in 1906. A number of exhibition matches against teams from Britain, combined with inner-city matches and the annual match between those of English and those of Scottish heritage in Saskatoon, Saskatchewan, helped keep soccer in the provincial spotlight. 
 
The greatest indicator of the prosperity of Saskatchewan soccer came with a new wave of participation during the 1950s and then in the 1960s with the inclusion of Saskatchewan teams in the newly formed Western Canadian Soccer League. Throughout the 1970s and 1980s, Saskatchewan soccer experienced continual expansion.  This soccer boom was prevalent in a number of communities such as Moose Jaw, Prince Albert and Yorkton; these good times were based on the youth movement, and to a lesser extent, immigration.

Adding further variety to Saskatchewan soccer during the 1970s and 1980s was the development of women's soccer.  Female teams were established at all age levels and star players emerged.  There was also an increase in female involvement off the playing field as more women became involved in coaching, officiating and administering the game.

The Regional Training Centre was opened in Saskatoon in 1986 and it has been utilized for a number of teams, including the Western Canada Games team in 1987, the Canada Summer Games team in 1989, the Women's All-Stars and the University of Saskatchewan teams.

By the end of the 1980s, soccer was growing in popularity throughout the province.  No longer strictly found in the main provincial centers, soccer was played in all sections of the province by a greater variety of players.  Towns and cities began to discover the wonderful game of soccer, engaging in a love affair that would continue into the next century.

During the 1990s soccer became an all year round sport as multimillion-dollar facilities were built throughout Saskatchewan. Soccer centers could be found in Regina, Saskatoon, Yorkton and Lloydminster.

More indoor soccer facilities were built in Warman and Moose Jaw in the first decade of the 21st century, and registrations increased to over 42,000 players participating in the sport of soccer in 2013. The organization's staff has increased in size to ten full-time employees making it the largest provincial sporting governing body in employees and participants.

The SSA operates the Saskatchewan Premier Soccer League: the highest level of amateur soccer competition in the province. Furthermore, it operates, in partnership with Lakeland College and the Meridian Youth Soccer Association (Lloydminster), The Rivers West Centre of Excellence.

The SSA is a member organization of the national sport governing body, the Canadian Soccer Association.

Regular members

The following organizations are members of the Saskatchewan Soccer Association 
Astra Soccer Academy
Battlefords Youth Soccer
Battlefords Senior Soccer Association
Briercrest College and Seminary
Broadview Soccer
Canora Soccer
Choiceland Soccer
Dundurn Community Association
Esterhazy Soccer
Estevan Senior Soccer Association
Estevan Youth Soccer Association
Futbol Club Regina
Grenfell Soccer
Humboldt and District Soccer Association
Ile a la Crosse Friendship Centre
JJ Soccer
Kindersley Minor Soccer Association
Kipling Soccer
La Loche Minor Sports
Lac La Ronge Tri-Community Soccer Association
Langenburg United Soccer Organization
Lanigan & District Soccer
Lloydminster & District Soccer Association
Meadow Lake Senior Soccer
Meadow Lake & District Youth Soccer
Melfort Youth Soccer Association
Melville Soccer
Meridian Youth Soccer Association
Montmartre Soccer
Moose Jaw Youth Soccer Association
Moose Mountain Soccer
Moosomin Soccer
Nipawin Indoor Soccer
Nipawin Outdoor Soccer
Oxbow Soccer
Poundmaker Youth Soccer
Prince Albert Youth Soccer Association
Prince Albert Senior Soccer Association
Qu'Appelle Valley Soccer Association
Queen City United Soccer
Redvers Soccer Club
Rocanville Soccer
Rosetown Soccer Association
Saskatoon Adult Soccer Inc
Saskatoon Youth Soccer Inc.
Shaunavon Soccer
Springside Minor Sports
Stoughton Soccer Club
Swift Current Soccer Association
TDSoccer
Tisdale Soccer
Town of Eston
Valley Soccer Association
Vibank Soccer
Watson Minor Sports
Watrous and District Association
Wawota Soccer
Weyburn Soccer Association
Whitewood Soccer
Wolseley Soccer
Wynyard Soccer
Yorkton Soccer Association

Associate members
Phantom Lake Soccer Club, MB
Regina Referees Association
Saskatoon & District Referees Association
University of Regina
University of Saskatchewan

David Newsham Award Winners 
The Saskatchewan Soccer Association (SSA) also recognizes participants (coaches, athletes, referees, volunteers, etc.) in sport of soccer on an annual basis. The premier award for dedication to the sport of soccer in the province of Saskatchewan is the David Newsham Award.
 
David Newsham was an athlete and leader in the Saskatchewan soccer community and was instrumental in the development of soccer in the province of Saskatchewan.

The David Newsham Award, is presented to an individual who has demonstrated exceptional volunteer service to the sport of soccer as well as an outstanding effort as well as dedication in their role as a coach, administrator or official.  
 
David Newsham Award Winners by Year

References

External links
 

Soccer in Saskatchewan
Soccer governing bodies in Canada
1905 establishments in Saskatchewan
Soccer
Sports organizations established in 1905